Arabian Nights is a 2015 internationally co-produced three-part drama film directed by Miguel Gomes and based on the One Thousand and One Nights,  comprising Volume 1: The Restless One, Volume 2: The Desolate One and Volume 3: The Enchanted One. It was screened as part of the Directors' Fortnight section at the 2015 Cannes Film Festival. The film was also selected to be shown in the Wavelengths section of the 2015 Toronto International Film Festival.

Part two, The Desolate One, was selected as the Portuguese entry for the Best Foreign Language Film at the 88th Academy Awards, but it was not nominated.

Plot
The film is set in Portugal, with the plot drawing from current events. The film's structure is based on the One Thousand and One Nights collection of fantasy tales.

Cast 
 Crista Alfaiate as Shahrazād
 Dinarte Branco as Uomo del Patronato
 Carloto Cotta as Traduttore
 Adriano Luz as Luis
 Joana de Verona as Vania
 Rogério Samora as Primo Ministro
 Maria Rueff as Ministro delle Finanze
 Cristina Carvalhal as Sereia
 Luísa Cruz as Juiza
 Américo Silva as Negoziante di Gado
 Bruno Bravo as Uomo della Banca Centrale Europea
 Tiago Fagulha as Uomo della Commissione Europea
 Teresa Madruga as Luisa
 Chico Chapas as Xico Chapas
 Carla Maciel as Nora
 Margarida Carpinteiro as Gloria

Production
Filming was expected to end in August 2014 and completed in February 2015.

The Restless One was released at 125 minutes, The Desolate One had a runtime of 132 minutes and The Enchanted One also clocks in at 125 minutes.

Release
The three installments of Arabian Nights premiered at the 2015 Cannes Film Festival. Volume 1: The Restless One on 16 May 2015, Volume 2: The Desolate One on 18 May 2015, and Volume 3: The Enchanted One on 20 May 2015. The films were released in France on 24 June, 29 July, and 26 August.

Critical reception
The series as a whole was received positively by critics. Rotten Tomatoes reports that Volume 1 has a 97% score based on 35 reviews, with an average rating of 8/10. The website's critics consensus reads: "Miguel Gomes' vibrant twist on Arabian Nights spins myriad yarns that coalesce into a colorful ode to Portugal." Volume 2 has a 100% score based on 17 reviews, with an average rating of 8.1/10. Volume 3 has a 88% score based on 25 reviews, with an average rating of 7.1/10. On Metacritic, Volume 1 has an 80 out of 100 rating based on 10 critics, indicating "generally favorable reviews". Volume 2 has an 81 out of 100 rating based on 9 critics, indicating "universal acclaim". Volume 3 has an 80 out of 100 rating based on 10 critics, indicating "generally favorable reviews".

See also
 List of submissions to the 88th Academy Awards for Best Foreign Language Film
 List of Portuguese submissions for the Academy Award for Best Foreign Language Film

References

External links
 
 
 
 

2015 films
2010s Portuguese-language films
2015 drama films
2015 independent films
French drama films
French independent films
German drama films
German independent films
Portuguese drama films
Portuguese independent films
Swiss drama films
Swiss independent films
Films based on One Thousand and One Nights
Films directed by Miguel Gomes
Films set in Portugal
Films shot in Portugal
Films released in separate parts
Golden Globes (Portugal) winners
2010s French films
2010s German films